In the 1892 general election, the Conservative Party, led by the Marquess of Salisbury, won the most seats but not an overall majority. As a result, William Gladstone's Liberal Party formed a minority government that relied upon Irish Nationalist support. On 3 March 1894, Gladstone resigned over the rejection of his Home Rule Bill and the Earl of Rosebery succeeded him.


Cabinets

Fourth Gladstone ministry

Rosebery ministry

Changes
May 1894 – James Bryce succeeds A. J. Mundella at the Board of Trade. Lord Tweedmouth succeeds Bryce at the Duchy of Lancaster, remaining also Lord Privy Seal.

List of ministers
Cabinet members are listed in bold face.

Notes

References

1892-1895
Government
1890s in the United Kingdom
1892 establishments in the United Kingdom
1895 disestablishments in the United Kingdom
Minority governments
Ministries of Queen Victoria
Ministry 4
Cabinets established in 1892
Cabinets disestablished in 1895

pl:Czwarty rząd Williama Ewarta Gladstone'a